Karuppur (Senapathy) is a village in the Ariyalur taluk of Ariyalur district, Tamil Nadu, India.

Demographics 
 census, Karuppur (Senapathy) had a total population of 4,334 with 2,186 males and 2,148 females.

References 

Villages in Ariyalur district